Tapout was an American reality television series that focuses on the world of mixed martial arts. The series premiered on Versus, which is now NBC Sports Network, on June 3, 2007, before moving to its regular Wednesday night timeslot beginning June 6. The series follows Charles Lewis, Jr. - "Mask", Dan Caldwell - "Punkass", and Tim Katz "SkySkrape" of the Tapout clothing and gear line, as they travel around the country in search of promising MMA fighters to develop and possibly sponsor. Each episode follows the training and development of one fighter, culminating in a fight at a professional MMA event.

As the series progressed the focus broadened to encompass not just the scouting of new talent but also the efforts of the Tapout crew to build their business, including day-to-day operations and the inter-relationships between the crew members and other Tapout employees.

On March 11, 2009, Charles "Mask" Lewis was killed in an automobile accident in Newport Beach, California. A female companion was ejected from the car and taken for medical treatment but Lewis was pronounced dead at the scene. The driver of a second car, believed to have been traveling alongside Lewis's car, was arrested on charges of gross vehicular manslaughter while intoxicated.

Season 1

Season 2

References

External links
 Official NBC Sports MMA website

2000s American reality television series
2007 American television series debuts
NBC Sports
Mixed martial arts television shows